The French Revolution was a period of social radial and political society in France from 1789 to 1799, including the creation of a constitutional monarchy, the Reign of Terror, execution of Louis XVI and the proclamation of the French First Republic.

French Revolution or La Révolution Française may also refer to:

Events in France
 July Revolution, or French Revolution of 1830, or Second French Revolution, replacing Bourbon king Charles X with his cousin Louis Philippe of Orléans
 French Revolution of 1848 or February Revolution, ending the July Monarchy and establishing the French Second Republic

Arts
 The French Revolution: A History, an 1837 book by Thomas Carlyle
 The French Revolution (poem), a 1791 poem by William Blake
 The French Revolution (novel), a 2009 novel by Matt Stewart 
 La Révolution Française, a 1973 French rock opera
 La Révolution française (film), a two-part 1989 film

See also
 
 
 
 
 French Revolutionary Wars 1792–1802, resulting from the French Revolution
 Révolution nationale, the ideological program of the Vichy regime in World War II
 May 68, a period of civil unrest in France
 Yellow vests movement, protests in France from 2018